"Paint Work" (often written as "Paintwork") is a 1985 song by the English Post-punk band The Fall that first appeared on their album This Nation's Saving Grace. Widely considered the high-point of the album, the track was described in 2019 as "absolutely sublime" by Vulture, and as "mildly psychedelic" in 2011 by critic Mick Middles.

Music
The semi-acoustic music is blended with tape collages and Smith's stream of consciousness lyrics which reply on the refrain "hey Mark", Karl Burns' cymbal crashes and Craig Scanlon's meandering lead guitar lines. Credited to both Smith and Brix, it blends studio recordings with sections recorded on a four track in Roger's flat, and audio from Smiths dictaphone. During the mixing, Smith took the master tape home and accidentally erased part of the track with a snippet from a documentary he was listening to from an Open University lecture by the astronomer Alan Cooper titled " How do red giants make Carbon?". According to Smith, he was "watching telly and singing along to the song after I'd played it, while [his home tape machine] was recording." The sudden jump between studio recordings and sudden inserts of home-taped passages fits the mood of the track, and he and Leckie decided to include on the finished version. Smith said "It fits in really good, you can't contrive something like that."

Lyrics
According to Brix, both "Paint Work" and the TNSG album track "My New House" were both written about the house in Sedgeley Park she had just bought to Mark. According to Brix "Hey Mark, you're messing up the paintwork" is something the decorator said." Smith said in a 1986 interview that the song lyrics contains "personal jottings and bits, but there's a lot there about England compared to Europe; how if you're not some flag-waving moron you don't fit in. This wasn't what England was about - it was about individuals. And that's what Paintwork was saying."

Personnel 
The Fall
 Mark E. Smith – vocals
 Brix Smith – guitar
 Steve Hanley – bass guitar
 Craig Scanlon – guitar
 Karl Burns – drums
 Simon Rogers – keyboards
Technical
 John Leckie – production, engineering
 Joe Gillingham – engineering

References

Sources

 Edge, Brian. Paintwork: Portrait of The Fall. London: Omnibus Press, 1989. 
 Ford, Simon. Hip Priest: The Story of Mark E.Smith and the Fall. London: Quartet Books, 2002. 
 Hanley, Steve. The Big Midweek: Life Inside The Fall. London: Route, 2014. 
 Irvin, Jim (ed). The Mojo Collection: 4th Edition. London: Canongate Books, 2017. 
 Norton, Tessa; Stanley, Bob. Excavate!: The Wonderful and Frightening World of The Fall . London: Faber & Faber, 2021. 
 Pringle, Steve. You Must Get Them All: The Fall On Record. London: Route Publishing, 2022. 
 Smith, Brix. The Rise, The Fall, and The Rise.  London: Faber & Faber, 2017. 

1985 songs
Songs written by Mark E. Smith
Songs written by Brix Smith
The Fall (band) songs